Yang Hyong-sop (1 October 1925 – 13 May 2022) was a North Korean politician who served as Chairman of the Standing Committee of the Supreme People's Assembly and Chairman of the Supreme People's Assembly from 1983 to 1998 (from 1994 it was formally the highest position in the state). He subsequently served as Vice President of the Presidium of the SPA from 1998 to 2019.

Life and career
Born in Hamhung on 1 October 1925, Yang attended Moscow State University and Kim Il-sung University, and was married to Kim Shin-sook, a cousin of Kim Il sung. According to the official biography released by the Korean Central News Agency, he joined the Korean People's Army in June 1950 (approximately when the Korean War started); after graduating from Kim Il-sung University, he served as section chief and then secretary of the Central Committee of the Workers' Party of Korea, Director of the Central Party School, Minister of Higher Education, and President of the .He was elected Chairman of the Standing Committee of the Supreme People's Assembly in 1983, after having been a vice-chairman since 1962; in this capacity, he assumed the functions of de facto head of state after Kim Il-sung's death in 1994, as the post of President of the Republic was never reassigned; however, actual power was held by Kim Jong-il. In 1998 a new Constitution passed the President's powers to the President of the Presidium; in the same year, Yang was replaced by Kim Yong-nam in that capacity, but continued to serve as vice-president again. He was also a member of the Politburo of the Workers' Party. On 6 January 2007, at a mass rally in Pyongyang, he gave a speech praising the North Korean government for building nuclear weapons. Yang Hyong-sop died of a stroke on 13 May 2022, at the age of 96.

Career accomplishments
October 1961: Appointed President of the Central Committee Party School (DPRK Workers' Party)
October 1962: Elected Supreme People's Assembly Vice-Chairman for 2nd–12th Assemblies of SPA.
November 1979: Appointed Chairman of the Democratic Front for the Reunification of the Fatherland 
June 1980: Appointed Chairman of the

References

External links

1925 births
2022 deaths
People from Hamhung
Chairmen of the Presidium of the Supreme People's Assembly
Members of the 6th Politburo of the Workers' Party of Korea
Alternate members of the 6th Politburo of the Workers' Party of Korea
Members of the 6th Central Committee of the Workers' Party of Korea
Kim Il-sung University alumni
Education ministers
Moscow State University alumni